Eleanor Frances Callier (born May 17, 1969), better known as Frances Callier, is an American producer, writer, comedian and retired actress. Her television credits include According to Jim, My Name Is Earl, Frasier, and Curb Your Enthusiasm. Callier is also known for her co-starring role in the British comedy, 3 Non-Blondes.

Career
She had a recurring role as Roxy the Bodyguard in the Disney Channel Original Series Hannah Montana.

Frances Callier is half of the comedy duo Frangela with Angela V. Shelton. She appears regularly as Frangela on VH1's Best Week Ever and together with Shelton on The Stephanie Miller Show. As of Spring 2019, the duo also do two weekly podcasts for Miller's Sexy Liberal Podcast Network (The Final Word and The Final Word - Idiot of the Week). She has been seen on CNN's Showbiz Tonight, Headline News, Fox News Red Eye and she is a regular contributor to NPR's Day to Day. She is a radio talk show host on KEIB Saturday afternoons. She left the NBC reality series I'm a Celebrity... Get Me out of Here!.

Callier also appeared in the Drake & Josh episode "Little Diva" as Helen, the movie theater manager to fill in for Yvette Nicole Brown, who could not make the taping due to filming the short lived series The Big House. She appeared in the unaired pilot episode of the Fox series Drive.

She appeared in the movie He's Just Not That Into You in a scene in the park with her comedy co-star Shelton. She has also been seen on MTV's Made, helping children with their diets.

Filmography

Film

Television

References

External links
 
 Frangela official website

1969 births
Living people
American women comedians
American television actresses
African-American actresses
Actresses from Chicago
21st-century American actresses
American voice actresses
Comedians from Illinois
21st-century American comedians
21st-century African-American women
21st-century African-American people
20th-century African-American people
20th-century African-American women